Brown-speckled whipsnake or brown vine snake (Ahaetulla pulverulenta) is a species of tree snake endemic to Sri Lanka. Populations in the Western Ghats of India are now considered a separate species, Ahaetulla sahyadrensis. It is known as හෙනකදයා (henakadaya) in Sinhala; this name provided the name anaconda.

Description
See snake scales for terms used
Snout pointed, terminating in a dermal appendage which is longer than the eye, formed below by the rostral, and covered above with numerous small scales or warts; the length of the snout, without the dermal appendage, more than twice the diameter of the eye. Nasals in contact behind the rostral appendage, or narrowly separated; no loreal; internasals and prefrontals in contact with the labials; frontal as long as its distance from the nasals, as long as the parietals or a little longer; two preoculars, with one subocular below, the upper preocular in contact with the frontal; two postoculars; temporals 2+3 or 2+2; upper labials 8, fifth entering the eye; 4 lower labials in contact with the anterior chin-shields, which are shorter than the posterior. Scales in 15 rows, ventrals 182–194; anal divided; subcaudals 154–173. Greyish, powdered with brown, with blackish transverse spots above; a dark brown rhomboidal spot on the upper surface of the head, and a brown band on each side, passing through the eye.
                 
Total length 5 feet 10 inches; tail 2 feet 4 inches.

Gallery

References

Further reading
 David, P. & Dubois, A. 2005. Découverte et redescription de l’holotype d’Ahaetulla pulverulenta (Dumérl, Bibron & Duméril, 1854) (Reptilia, Serpentes, Colubridae), avec une remarque sur le statut de Dryinus fuscus Dumérl, Bibron & Duméril, 1854. Zoosystema 27 (1): 163-178 [in French]
 Duméril, A. M. C., Bibron, G. & Duméril, A. H. A., 1854 Erpétologie générale ou histoire naturelle complète des reptiles. Tome septième. Deuxième partie, comprenant l'histoire des serpents venimeux. Paris, Librairie Encyclopédique de Roret: i-xii + 781-1536
 Khaire, A.;Khaire, N. 1993 Occurrence of brown whip snake Ahaetulla pulverulenta (Dum. & Bibr.) in Pune, India Snake 25: 147-148
 Venkatraman, C.;Gokula, V.;Kumar, Saravana 1997 Occurrence of brown whip snake (Ahaetulla pulverulenta) in Siruvani foothills Cobra 28: 36-37

External links
 https://www.flickr.com/photos/lal_trekila/5824193473/
 https://www.flickr.com/photos/lal_trekila/5811369272/

Ahaetulla
Snakes of Asia
Reptiles of Sri Lanka
Endemic fauna of Sri Lanka
Reptiles described in 1854
Taxa named by André Marie Constant Duméril
Taxa named by Gabriel Bibron
Taxa named by Auguste Duméril